Al Baraka (Pakistan) Limited (ABPL) came into being as a result of the first merger in the Islamic Banking sector of Pakistan.  The merger took place between the branch operations of Al Baraka Islamic Bank (AIB) Bahrain, Al Baraka Islamic Bank Pakistan (AIBP) and Emirates Global Islamic Bank (Pakistan), and thus from 1st November 2010, the operations of the merged entity began. The second merger took place in 2016 with Burj Bank Ltd. As of September 2016, the Bank has a national presence in Pakistan with a network of 191 branches in more than 97 cities across the country.

History 
Al Baraka Islamic Bank is attributed to be the pioneer of Islamic Banking in Pakistan.  It has been operating in the country since 1991 as branch operations of Al Baraka Islamic Bank Bahrain.  During this period of over two decades in the country, the bank effectively developed and sustained its identity as one of the pioneers in providing Shariah compliant banking products and services. It has the best collection department compared to all the banks in Pakistan.

Credit Rating 
Long Term Credit Rating of Al Baraka (Pakistan) Ltd is June 26, 2020, maintained at A [Triple A] and Short-Term Credit Rating of the bank is maintained at A1 [A one] by Pakistan Credit Rating Agency (PACRA).

Al Baraka Banking Group 
ABPL is a subsidiary of the Al Baraka Banking Group (ABG) which is a renowned Islamic Banking group in the Persian Gulf region. ABG is a Bahrain Join Stock company listed on Bahrain and NASDAQ Dubai stock exchanges. ABG’s authorized capital amounts to US$1.5 billion, has an asset base over US$24 billion and total equity amounting to US$2.5 billion.  ABG has a wide global presence. The banking units and representative offices of the group are present in 17 countries covering 3 continents: Asia, MENA and Europe. As of 2013, Al Baraka has a significant presence in Bahrain, Algeria, Jordan, Lebanon, Indonesia, Tunisia, Sudan, Turkey, South Africa, Libya, Iraq, Saudi Arabia and Pakistan. Today the ABG network consists of more than 700 branches worldwide.

Awards and recognition
 Al Baraka was named the 'Best regional Bank' at the Annual Islamic Business and Finance Awards Ceremony, Dubai (26 December 2010) 
 ABG won the Compliance and Corporate Governance Award at the Hawkamah Union of Arab Banks 2010 (1 November 2010)

ABPL's Commitment to Islamic Banking 
Islamic Finance, after a steady growth initially, is now experiencing a progressive upward trend in the Pakistani banking sector. From a meager 0.3% share in 2003, Islamic banking institutions (IBIs) have now captured around 15.6% of the total asset pie in the banking industry as of March 2019.

The core philosophy of ABPL is compliance with the fundamental principles of Shariah.  The entire banking activities are closely monitored and regulated by a Board of Shariah Advisors at the headquarters in Bahrain as well as a Shariah Advisory Committee in Pakistan.

All policies, procedures, products and services of ABPL are approved by the bank's Shariah Board, headed by ‘Shaikh Essam Mohammad Ishaq Abdul Rahman Ishaq’ who is known amongst the most renowned and respected Shariah scholar in the Islamic finance industry and has an international repute. Along with him, Mufti Abdullah Najeeb is providing his services to Shariah Board as Resident Shariah board Member.

Products and Services 
Al Baraka’s customers range from individuals and retails to corporate, SME and consumer categories. Various financing products are available for investments such as Murabaha, Ijarah, Musharakah and Islamic Export Refinance etc. Furthermore, a range of Shariah compliant deposit schemes are offered.

Debit cards

References 

Islamic banks of Pakistan
Pakistani subsidiaries of foreign companies